105 Mile Post 2 (2006 population 5) is an Indian reserve in the Thompson Country of the Interior of British Columbia, Canada, just west of the town of Ashcroft.  The reserve is administered by the Ashcroft Indian Band of the Nlaka'pamux people.

This Indian Reserve should not be confused with 105 Mile House, which is a locality near 100 Mile House farther north.

Demographics

 N/A = Data Not Available
 * = Population is rounded to allow confidentiality.

References

105 Mile Post 2's population Data

105 Mile Post
Thompson Country
Nlaka'pamux